Epping Forest is a local government district in Essex, England. Situated in the west of the county, bordering northeastern Greater London, it is named after, and contains a large part of, Epping Forest.

The district lies wholly within the county of Essex. It is one of 12 districts within the Essex County Council area.

Epping, Buckhurst Hill, Chigwell, Chipping Ongar, Loughton and Waltham Abbey lie within Epping Forest district. The River Roding runs through the eastern portion of the district, with the Lea Valley in the west.

Buckhurst Hill, Chigwell, Waltham Abbey and Loughton, although they are not within Greater London, are included in the Office for National Statistics definition of the Greater London Built-up Area.

Epping Forest District Council is headquartered in High Street, Epping.

Epping Forest district is bounded by the Harlow, Uttlesford, Chelmsford and Brentwood districts of Essex, the East Hertfordshire and Broxbourne districts of Hertfordshire, and the London boroughs of Havering, Redbridge, Waltham Forest and Enfield.

Settlement

The whole district is divided into civil parishes a majority of which, particularly in the north and east of the district are rural and sparsely populated for an area so close to London; it includes the town of Chipping Ongar
 and surrounding villages. The south is more suburban and dominated by Loughton, the largest town in the district. Most of the District has a wide range of architectural styles and periods.  Loughton is beside Epping Forest to the west and separated by farms, rivers and golf courses from other settlements in other directions.  As an example of conserved physical geographic landscapes, the Roding Valley and Three Forests Way  (one end of the Stort Valley Way and the other end connecting to the Harcamlow Way in Hatfield Forest and National Nature Reserve, Essex which is north of Epping Forest District.
The settlements here are close to, and in places (Chigwell and Buckhurst Hill) are contiguous with, London's conurbation. Although entirely outside Greater London, for Eurostat statistical purposes the district is included in the Greater London Urban Area, demonstrating a degree of close economic dependence on the capital.

History
The district was formed on 1 April 1974 by the merger of Chigwell Urban District, Epping Urban District and Waltham Holy Cross Urban District, along with most of Epping and Ongar Rural District. Since then there have been some changes to the Greater London boundary:

 In 1994, which now form Enfield Island Village, were transferred to the London Borough of Enfield
 In 1995 a small area around Grange Hill and Roding Valley stations was transferred to the London Borough of Redbridge.

Transport

Rail 
Roydon railway station on the West Anglia Main Line is the only National Rail station within the district, which lies on the district boundary with East Hertfordshire. Sawbridgeworth railway station on the same line lies directly east of the district, within Hertfordshire. Both stations are served by Greater Anglia trains either between London Liverpool Street and Ely, and London Stratford and Bishop's Stortford, with direct connections to destinations such as Broxbourne, Tottenham Hale, Audley End and Cambridge.

Harlow Town railway station in neighbouring Harlow is additionally served by Greater Anglia's Stansted Express trains, with a direct connection to Stansted Airport.

The London Underground Central line passes through the southern portion of Epping Forest. Epping, Theydon Bois, Debden and Loughton stations in the borough fall in London fare zone 6, with Buckhurst Hill in zone 5 and Roding Valley, Chigwell and Grange Hill in zone 4.

The Central line provides the district with direct connections with East London, The City, the West End, and West London. Transport for London manages the London Underground network.

A former portion of the Central line between Epping and Chipping Ongar, via North Weald and Blake Hall, is part of the Epping Ongar Railway.

Road 
Two motorways meet in the district - the M25 London Orbital motorway and the M11 motorway.

The M25 motorway runs eastbound (clockwise) towards Brentwood and the Dartford Crossing. The motorway runs westbound (anticlockwise) towards Enfield, Watford and Heathrow Airport. The route is part of the international E-road network - part of E30 between Cork in Ireland and Omsk in Russia. The M25 meets the A121 within the district at junction 26, near Waltham Abbey, and the M11 at junction 27 near Epping.

The M11 motorway runs northbound towards Stansted Airport and Cambridge, and southbound towards East London. Junctions 5 (A1168, Loughton and Chigwell), 6 (M25), 7 (A414, Harlow) and 7A (A1025, Harlow) fall within Epping Forest.

Other main routes in the district include:

 A414 primary route - between Harlow and Chelmsford, via Ongar. Onward connections towards Hemel Hempstead via Harlow, and Maldon;
 A104 Epping New Road - between Wake Arms and Woodford. Onward connections towards Leyton and Islington;
 A112 - between Waltham Abbey and Sewardstone. Onward connections towards Walthamstow and Stratford;
 A113 - between Chipping Ongar and Chigwell. Onward connections towards Wanstead;
 A121 - between Waltham Cross and Woodford, via Waltham Abbey, Loughton and Buckhurst Hill;
 A128 - Chipping Ongar. Onward connections towards Brentwood and Thurrock;
 A1069 - Onward connections towards Chingford;
 A1112 - Chigwell Row. Onward connections towards Chadwell Heath;
 A1168 - between Loughton and Chigwell;
 B184 - between Ongar and Great Dunmow. Onward connections towards Saffron Walden;
 B1393 - between Wake Arms and M11 junction 7, via Epping.

Most public highways in the district are managed by Essex County Council. The M11 and M25 motorways are managed by National Highways.

Cycling 
National Cycle Network Route 1 passes along the eastern boundary of the district near Broxbourne, through Harlow, and east-west through the district via High Laver, Moreton and Fyfield.

A shared-use path runs alongside the Rivers Lee and Stort, which connect the district with other cycle routes in Hertfordshire and London.

Epping Forest features a network of shared-use forest trails, managed by the City of London Corporation.

Aviation 
North Weald Airfield is owned by Epping Forest District Council and is open to general aviation. Flying out of North Weald began in 1916, during the First World War.

Stapleford Aerodrome is home to a flight training centre within the district.

London Stansted Airport, an international passenger and freight airport, lies in the neighbouring district of Uttlesford, north of the district.

Rivers 
The Lee Navigation and River Stort are navigable rivers which form the district's eastern boundary. They are managed by the Canal and River Trust, and connect with the Regent's Canal in London via Hertford Union Canal.

Nature reserves
Epping Forest District Council has a portfolio of nine nature local nature reserves (LNRs):

 Chigwell Row Wood LNR
 Church Lane Flood Meadow LNR
 Home Mead LNR
 Linder's Field LNR
 Nazeing Triangle LNR
 Roding Valley Meadows LNR
 Roughtalley's Wood LNR
 Thornwood Flood Meadow LNR
 Weald Common Flood Meadows LNR

Roding Valley Meadows Local Nature Reserve (LNR) is the district's oldest nature reserve, designated in 1986, and the largest at 56 hectares.

Seven Sites of Special Scientific Interest on the Natural England register fall within Epping Forest. These are:

 Epping Forest
 Cornmill Stream and Old River Lea
 Hainault Forest
 Hunsdon Mead (part)
 Roding Valley Meadows
 Turnford and Cheshunt Pits (part)
 Waltham Abbey

Essex Wildlife Trust manages sites at:

 Gernon Bushes Nature Reserve, near Coopersale
 Hunsdon Mead, near Roydon
 Roding Valley Meadows, near Chigwell

Epping Forest partially falls within the Epping Forest district. It has been owned and conserved by the City of London Corporation - the local authority which governs the Square Mile - since the Epping Forest Act 1878.

Politics

Following the general election of 8 June 2017, the current members of parliament for the district are:

Eleanor Laing (Conservative) - Epping Forest constituency, covering the majority of the west of the district, including the towns of Buckhurst Hill, Loughton, Chigwell, Theydon Bois, Epping and Waltham Abbey.
Alex Burghart (Conservative) - Brentwood and Ongar constituency, mostly covering the part of the district east of the River Roding, including the parish of Ongar and village of North Weald Bassett.
Robert Halfon (Conservative) - Harlow constituency, which includes the villages of Roydon and Lower Nazeing to the west of Harlow, and Sheering, Matching and Hastingwood to the east.

County Council
Of the seven Essex County Councillors elected for Epping Forest divisions in the most recent county council elections in 2021, six are from the Conservative Party, and one is from Loughton Residents Association.

Local government
The district council is now based in Epping, roughly in the centre of the district. Its offices were previously located in Loughton.

Since 2002, when the ward boundaries were reorganised resulting in the loss of one council seat, the district has had 58 Councillors representing 32 wards. Each ward is represented by one, two or three Councillors, depending on the ward's population, so that each Councillor represents a roughly equal proportion of the district's electorate.

Councillors serve for a four-year term. They are elected on a cycle of thirds, i.e. in three years out of every four, a third of the council is up for election, and no elections take place in the fourth year. When the ward boundaries were reorganised in 2002, all 58 seats were up for election.

The wards are:

District council election results since 2002

The table below summarises the number of seats held by each party after each year's elections (no elections took place in 2005, 2009, 2013 and 2017). The council returned to Conservative control following the gain of a seat in a by-election in December 2006 after being under no overall control since 1994.

List of parishes in Epping Forest district 

Abbess Beauchamp and Berners Roding 
Bobbingworth 
Buckhurst Hill 
Chigwell 
Epping (town council)
Epping Upland 
Fyfield 
High Laver 
High Ongar 
Lambourne 
Little Laver 
Loughton (town council)
Magdalen Laver 
Matching 
Moreton 
Nazeing 
North Weald Bassett 
Ongar (town council)
Roydon 
Sheering 
Stanford Rivers 
Stapleford Abbotts 
Stapleford Tawney 
Theydon Bois 
Theydon Garnon 
Theydon Mount 
Waltham Abbey (town council)
Willingale

Arms

Notes

References

External links

 
Non-metropolitan districts of Essex